Guðmundur Þórður Guðmundsson (born 23 December 1960) is an Icelandic handball coach and former player. In 2016, he guided Denmark men's team to gold in the 2016 Olympics. In 2008, he won silver with the Icelandic men's national team at the 2008 Olympic games in China.

Career
He was the head coach of the Iceland men's national handball team 2001–2004 and again 2008–2012. Under his command the Iceland national team received a silver medal at the 2008 Summer Olympics in Beijing and bronze medal at the 2010 European Championship in Austria.

Guðmundur is ranked with Dagur Sigurðsson his fellow countryman, who is the current national team coach of Japan's Men's team and another, Alfreð Gíslason, coach of THW Kiel amongst the best coaches of our era. He has cited former coach Bogdan Kowalczyk as a major influence.

In October 2013, it was announced that Guðmundur would take over as the head coach the Danish men's national handball team on 1 July 2014, replacing Ulrik Wilbek . On 21 August 2016 Guðmundur led his team to the gold medal at the 2016 Summer Olympics in Rio de Janeiro, Brazil. During the Olympics, Wilbek made two attempts to gain the consent of the Danish players to fire Guðmundur, once during the tournament and then the day after Denmark won the gold. He announced in November 2016 that he would not renew his contract, which was set to expire on 1 July 2017. After his departure from the Denmark team, Guðmundur criticized his predecessor Wilbek's, who was then the head of the Danish Handball Federation, repeated attempts to undercut his management of the team during the Olympics.

It was reported in April 2017 that he would take over the Bahrain men's national handball team.

In 2018 he returned to coach the Icelandic national team for the third time. He signed a contract for three years. On 11 January 2020, he faced Denmark for the first time since his departure and guided Iceland to a 30–31 victory.

In February 2020 Guðmundur took over as a coach at MT Melsungen in the German Bundesliga. He signed a contract to the end of the season but remained coach of the Icelandic national team. In september 2021, he was sacked after 3 league matches only

On 21 February 2023, Guðmundur resigned as the manager of the Icelandic national team after five years at the helm.

Honours

Player
Víkingur R.

Icelandic champion (6): 1979–80, 1980–81, 1981–82, 1982–83, 1985–86, 1986–87
Icelandic cup: 1982–83, 1983–84, 1984–85, 1985–86

Manager
Fram
Icelandic champion: 2006
Rhein-Neckar Löwen
EHF Cup 2012–2013
Iceland
Olympic games: 
: 2008
EHF Euro:
: 2010

Denmark
Olympic games:
: 2016

Bahrain
Asian championship:
: 2018

References

External links

1960 births
Living people
Icelandic male handball players
Icelandic handball coaches
Olympic handball players of Iceland
Handball players at the 1984 Summer Olympics
Handball players at the 1988 Summer Olympics
Icelandic expatriate sportspeople in Bahrain
Icelandic expatriate sportspeople in Denmark
Icelandic expatriate sportspeople in Germany
Sportspeople from Reykjavík
Medalists at the 2008 Summer Olympics
Handball coaches of international teams